The Women's 4 × 400 metres relay event at the 2011 European Athletics U23 Championships was held in Ostrava, Czech Republic, at Městský stadion on 17 July.

Medalists

Results

Final
17 July 2011 / 18:40

Participation
According to an unofficial count, 28 athletes from 7 countries participated in the event.

References

4 x 400 metres relay
Relays at the European Athletics U23 Championships
2011 in women's athletics